Ocimum centraliafricanum, the copper flower or copper plant, is a perennial herb found in central Africa (DRC, Tanzania, Zambia, Zimbabwe). It is well known for its tolerance of high levels of copper in the soil, and is even used by geologists prospecting for precious metals.

Description
It is able to tolerate soils with copper concentrations of up to 15,000 ppm, and soils with nickel concentrations of almost 5000 ppm.

References

centraliafricanum
Flora of Africa
Plants described in 1916